Hafiz Rahim (19 November 1983 – 9 July 2020) was a Singaporean footballer who played as a forward.

Club career
Hafiz had previously played for S.League club Geylang United, Singapore Armed Forces FC, Gombak United and Home United.

International career
Hafiz earned his first international cap against Thailand on 24 August 2011. He scored his only international goal against Laos on 7 June 2013.

Career statistics

International
International goals

Honours

International
Singapore
ASEAN Football Championship: 2012

Personal life
Hafiz died on 9 July 2020 during a motorcycle accident when the speeding lorry knocked him down at Tampines Ave 8, at the age of 36. Hafiz was unconscious when conveyed to Changi General Hospital (CGH), where he subsequently died. He was married and had three children.

References 

1983 births
2020 deaths
Singaporean footballers
Singapore international footballers
Association football forwards
Geylang International FC players
Warriors FC players
Gombak United FC players
Home United FC players
Singapore Premier League players
Place of birth missing
Road incident deaths in Singapore